Satsuo (written: 薩夫, 察男 or 左都夫) is a masculine Japanese given name. Notable people with the name include:

, Japanese diplomat
, Japanese long-distance runner
, Japanese film director

Japanese masculine given names